The Sony Xperia XA1 Plus is an Android touchscreen smartphone developed by Sony Mobile. It was released in August, 2017. It is equipped with Android 7.0 (Nougat), a 3430 mAh battery, a 5.5 in display, and a 23 MP main camera.

Specifications

Hardware
The Sony Xperia XA1 Plus has a 5.5 in Full HD 1080p display. The phone has a MediaTek helio P20 Octa Core 64bit (Quad Core 2.3 GHz + Quad Core 1.6 GHz) CPU and a Mali-T880MP2 GPU. It also comes with 3/4GB RAM and 32GB internal storage. It can be expanded via microSDXC, up to 256GB additional storage. The phone measures 155x75x8.7mm. It comes with a non-removable 3430 mAh battery and Quick Charging.

Camera
The Sony Xperia XA1 Plus is equipped with an impressive 23MP back facing camera, which is complemented by an 8MP forward facing camera.

Software
The Sony Xperia XA1 Plus comes standard with Android 7.0 (Nougat), but is upgradable to Android 8.0 (Oreo).

History
The Sony Xperia XA1 Plus was released in August 2017 and was available October of the same year.

See also
Sony Mobile Communications Inc.
Sony Xperia

References

Mobile phones introduced in 2017
Android (operating system) devices
Sony mobile phones